The 2019 Suzuki Polish Basketball Cup was the 55th edition of Poland's national cup competition for men basketball teams. It was managed by the Polish Basketball League (PLK) and was held in Warsaw, in the Arena Ursynów for the third time in a row in February 2019. BM Slam Stal Ostrów Wielkopolski won its first-ever Cup title in club history.

Qualified teams
The eight first qualified after the first half of the 2018–19 PLK season qualified to the tournament. The highest placed four teams would play the lowest seeded teams in the quarter-finals. Legia Warsaw qualified as host of the tournament, and gained automatic qualification.

Bracket

See also
2018–19 PLK season

References

Polish Basketball Cup
Cup